John Lorenzini is a former Australian rules footballer, who played for the Fitzroy Football Club in the Victorian Football League (VFL).

His daughter, Erin Todd, played basketball in the Women's National Basketball League and plays football for Greater Western Sydney in the AFL Women's.

References

External links

Fitzroy Football Club players
1956 births
Living people
Australian rules footballers from Victoria (Australia)